Suresh Gyan Vihar University (SGVU) is a not-for-profit autonomous private university located in Jaipur, Rajasthan, India. In 2017, the university became the first private university in Rajasthan to be awarded an 'A' grade by National Assessment and Accreditation Council. The university was established through the Suresh Gyan Vihar University, Jaipur Act (Act no. 16 of 2008) of the government of Rajasthan. Its predecessor institution, Gyan Vihar College, Jaipur, had been in existence since 1999. Its parent institution, Sahitya Sadawart Samiti, was founded in 1938.

The university has launched tie-ups with various industries in the past few years as an effort to introduce project-based learning. These include IBM, Harvard Business Publishing, Amazon, Google and Bombay Stock Exchange. IBM and Gyan Vihar have combined to start programs in B.Tech. artificial intelligence, Cloud Computing, Data Analytics and Internet of Things.

Gyan Vihar is the first private university in Jaipur to receive accreditation from NBA. Suresh Gyan Vihar University ranks highly on the research ranking platform of Transparent Ranking released by Spanish National Research Council (CSIC) every year based on Google Citation Index. Gyan Vihar ranked 25th all over the country and first in the state with 71734 points for citation. Leading ahead of various IITs, NITs and IIMs. The university was ranked 3rd in India by The Financial Express of the Indian Express Group in the "Comprehensive Study of Universities Established after 2000". The Pioneer awarded the university "5 Stars" in ranking the best private universities in the country.

History

Sahitya Sadawart Samiti

Sahitya Sadawart which literally translates to unfettered and all-pervasive dissemination of knowledge is the umbrella organization under whose aegis multiple schools, colleges, research centers and a university have taken shape. Sahitya Sadawart was established in the year 1938, by Shri Kamlakar ‘Kamal’ and a young Acharya Shri Purushottam ‘Uttam’. Gyanvihar, which commenced its journey as an experiment to redefine school education in Jaipur has now culminated into Gyanvihar Universe, Suresh Gyanvihar University and Gyanvihar School being the more recognized names. Gyan Vihar School came into existence in the year 1994. The foundation stone of Gyan Vihar was laid on 19 February 1994 by Acharya Purushottam and Shri Suresh Sharma.

School of Engineering & Technology

In 1999, Gyan Vihar decided to launch a technical education institution, the Gyan Vihar School of Engineering & Technology, which was spread over 32 Acres of land within the municipal limits of Jaipur City.

Establishment of the university
The college grew in disciplines and enrollment numbers and in the year 2008 became the constituent college of the newly formed Suresh Gyan Vihar University. In the years since, the university has forayed into numerous other disciplines including Engineering, Pharmacy, Management, Hospitality, Interdisciplinary and Liberal Studies, Hospitality, Applied Sciences and Agriculture, Journalism and Arts, etc. The university initiated under the guidance of Chairman Shri Sunil Sharma and Dr. Sudhanshu as its first vice-chancellor. Since 2012, Dr. Sudhanshu has continued administration as the Chief Mentor of the university.

Gyan Vihar University was established by Government of Rajasthan Act No. 16 of 2008, passed in state Assembly of Rajasthan, giving it the status of 'State University'. University Grant Commission released the approval for the establishment of the university and empowered to award degrees as specified by the UGC U/S 22 of UGC Act 1956 through its notification no. F.9-38/2008(CPP-I) dated 1 April 2009. Gyan Vihar is included in the list of private universities maintained by the University Grants Commission under section 2 (f) of UGC Act 1956.

Organisation and administration

The academic programmes of the university are run under different schools for streamlining the operations. These are

 Gyan Vihar School of Engineering and technology
 Gyan Vihar School of Pharmacy
 Gyan Vihar International School of Business management
 Gyan Vihar School of Humanities and Social Sciences
 Gyan Vihar School of Education
 Gyan Vihar School of Hotel Management
 Gyan Vihar School of Applied Sciences and Agriculture
 Suresh Gyan Vihar University- Distance Education

Research
Gyan Vihar has established 12 research centres to focus research and development in wide range of topics. These research centres run with various industrial collaborations. The university received a total of ₹ 1200 million fund as endowment in the year 2017.

Convention on climate change and water
Convention on Climate Change and Water (C3W) is an annual academic event organised by Suresh Gyan Vihar University Jaipur. Scholars, activists, social workers, innovators, writers and researchers participate in this event and present their insights into issues relating to climate change, water crisis, and alternate energy sources.

Location 
The main campus of the university is situated in the suburbs of the city of Jaipur. Gyan Vihar University comprises three campuses with over all area of 130 acres including a climate change research centre based near Sambhar Salt Lake.

Accreditation
In 2017, the university was awarded an 'A' grade by National Assessment and Accreditation Council (NAAC).

References

</noinclude>

Universities and colleges in Jaipur
Universities in Rajasthan
Private universities in India
2008 establishments in Rajasthan
Educational institutions established in 2008